Micrartemon is a genus of air-breathing land snails, terrestrial pulmonate gastropod mollusks in the family Streptaxidae.

Distribution 
The distribution of the genus Micrartemon includes:
 the Philippines

Species
Species within the genus Micrartemon include:

References

Streptaxidae